The following is a list of programs on the television network Decades. Some of the television series rights were produced and distributed by the CBS Television Distribution library.

Current programming 
 The Ed Sullivan Show
 The Lucy Show (February 28, 2015 - present)
 The Donna Reed Show (February 20, 2015 - present)
 Family Affair (January 20, 2015 - present)
 Petticoat Junction (August 14, 2015 - present)
 I Love Lucy (February 24, 2015 - present)
 The Carol Burnett Show (April 18, 2022 - present)
 The Mary Tyler Moore Show (July 2, 2015 - present)
 The Dick Van Dyke Show 
 The Many Loves of Dobie Gillis (February 16, 2015 - present)
 Through the Decades (May 25, 2015 - present)
 Our Miss Brooks (September 23, 2015 - present)
 Dark Shadows (May 13, 2015 - present)
 The Millionaire (January 15, 2015 - present)
 Rowan & Martin's Laugh-In (April 18, 2022 - present)
 The Odd Couple 
 The Dick Cavett Show (February 2, 2016 - present)
 Cheers
 Taxi 
 The Bob Newhart Show (July 7, 2015 - present)
 Get Smart (January 25, 2015 - present)
 The Phil Silvers Show (January 28, 2015 - present)
 Car 54, Where Are You? (March 3, 2015 - present)
 The Abbott and Costello Show (March 10, 2015 - present)
 The Honeymooners

E/I
 Animal Outtakes
 Animal Rescue Classics
 Missing: Cold Cases

Former programming 

 1968 Democratic National Convention (August 6, 2018)
 21 Jump Street (December 18, 2015)
 The Achievers (June 10, 2015)
 The Alfred Hitchcock Hour (April 29, 2016)
 The Best of The Ed Sullivan Show
 The Beverly Hillbillies (June 4, 2015)
 Beverly Hills 90210
 Black Sheep Squadron (April 9, 2016)
 The Bob Newhart Show (July 7, 2015)
 Bosom Buddies (May 18, 2020)
 Branded (June 22, 2015)
 The Brady Bunch (June 24, 2015)
 Broken Arrow (July 6, 2015)
 Brooklyn Bridge (July 2, 2019)
 Burke's Law (February 3, 2015)
 Cannon (July 21, 2015)
 Car 54, Where Are You? (March 3, 2015)
 Celebrity Bowling (March 8, 2015)
 Cheers
 Colonel March of Scotland Yard (February 3, 2015)
 Combat! (June 5, 2015)
 Dark Shadows (May 13, 2015)
 The Dick Cavett Show (February 2, 2016)
The Dick Van Dyke Show
 Diff'rent Strokes (February 11, 2018)
 Disasters of the Century (June 11, 2015)
 The Donna Reed Show (February 20, 2015)
 The Doris Day Show (January 31, 2015)
The Facts of Life (February 17, 2018)
 Family Affair (January 20, 2015)
 Family Law
Ferris Beuller
 The Fugitive (May 20, 2015)
 Get Smart (January 25, 2015)
 Greatest Moments of the 20th Century (January 4, 2016)
 Greatest Sports Legends (June 26, 2015)
 The Greats (May 25, 2015)
 Hey Moe, Hey Dad!
 Hill Street Blues (January 16, 2016)
 Hollywood Remembers (May 3, 2016)
 Hollywood Rivals (April 8, 2016)
 Honey West (February 6, 2015)
 Hunter (April 7, 2016)
 I Love Lucy (February 24, 2015)
 The Immortal
 The Invisible Man (February 5, 2015)
 The Jeffersons
 The Joan Rivers Show
 Kojak (January 23, 2016)
 Kung Fu (April 22, 2015)
 Lancer
 Lords of the Mafia (January 13, 2016)
 The Loretta Young Show (August 12, 2015)
 Love, American Style (February 11, 2015)
 The Love Boat
 The Lucy-Desi Comedy Hour (February 27, 2015)
 The Lucy Show (February 28, 2015)
 Make Room For Daddy (July 15, 2015)
 Mannix
 The Many Loves of Dobie Gillis (February 16, 2015)
 The Mary Tyler Moore Show (July 2, 2015)
 Matt Houston (July 8, 2015)
 McCloud (March 12, 2016)
 McMillan and Wife (November 17, 2015)
 Melrose Place
 The Millionaire (January 15, 2015)
 The Mod Squad (June 23, 2015) (as part of the "Fan-tastic" block) 
 The Mothers-in-Law (January 19, 2015)
 Moviestar (June 4, 2015)
 Mr. Lucky (July 22, 2015)
 My Three Sons (June 24, 2015)
 The Naked City (March 17, 2015)
 Newhart
 One Step Beyond
 Our Miss Brooks (September 23, 2015)
 Perry Mason (September 21, 2015)
 Peter Gunn (April 3, 2015)
 Petticoat Junction (August 14, 2015)
 The Phil Silvers Show (January 28, 2015)
 Police Squad!
 Power Players (January 1, 2016)
 The Powers of Matthew Star (May 27, 2019)
 The Rat Patrol (May 25, 2015)
 Ripley's Believe it or Not! (January 2, 2017)
 The Rogues (March 16, 2015)
 Route 66 (February 7, 2015)
 The Royal Family
 The Saint (March 30, 2015)
 Sledge Hammer!
 Square Pegs
 The Streets of San Francisco (May 11, 2017)
 Studio One (September 14, 2015)
 That Girl (June 13, 2015)
 12 O'Clock High (August 7, 2015)
 Unforgettable (June 29, 2019)
 The Untouchables (March 11, 2015)
 Vega$ (July 8, 2015)
 The Veil (July 2, 2019)
 The White Shadow (April 6, 2016)
 The Young Indiana Jones Chronicles

References 

Decades
Weigel Broadcasting